Local elections were held in Malta on 8 March 2008, the same day of the general election. This year, the election was held in 23 of the 68 Maltese localities. These 23 localities are: Valletta (the capital city), Senglea (Città Invicta), Żebbuġ (Città Rohan), Żejtun (Città Beland), Balzan, Dingli, Fontana, Għajnsielem, Għasri, Iklin, Kirkop, Marsa, Mellieħa, Mqabba, Nadur, Pembroke, Qrendi, San Ġiljan, San Pawl il-Baħar, Santa Venera, Ta' Xbiex, Xewkija and Żurrieq. A separate local election was held on 24 May in Mtarfa, after the previous council was dissolved a monthly earlier. Of the candidates that ran for the Mtarfa May election, in which 3 councillors were elected for the Nationalist Party while 2 councillors were elected for the Malta Labour Party (MLP).

Candidates for both elections
In total for the March election, 241 candidates ran for office. Of these 241 candidates, 120 were candidates for the Malta Labour Party (MLP), 110 for the Nationalist Party (PN), six for Democratic Alternative, and one candidate for the Alpha Party. Four candidates ran as independents.12 candidates contested the May election,

Voter turnout
Voter turnout was lowest in San Pawl il-Baħar (68 percent turnout) and highest in Dingli and Qrendi (both 94 percent turnout).

Results

External links
Electoral Commission
Department of Information - Malta

References

2008
2008 elections in Europe
2008 in Malta
March 2008 events in Europe